George Whiting Badman (21 December 1886 –  3 September 1953) was a South Australian business man and horse breeder and owner.

Business
 Angaston Quarries
 X. L. Quarries

Horse racing

Breeder
 Royal Gem (foaled 1942 in Australia, out of French Gem), a versatile Thoroughbred racehorse that won 23 races ranging from 5 furlongs (1,000 metres) to 12 furlongs (2,400 m). He was later a successful sire in the United States.
 Good Whiskey, 1930 winner of the Australian Steeplechase at Caulfield Racecourse

Owner
 Aurie's Star (foaled in 1932), (leased for 3 years by G. W. Badman from J. Murphy of Hamley Bridge) a gelding who won 28 of his 89 starts, including the 1937 Newmarket Handicap, the 1937 and 1939 Oakleigh Plate as well as the 1940 Goodwood Handicap.
 French Gem, winner of the 1938 VRC Oaks and dam of Royal Gem
 Royal Gem

Family
Badman was born on 21 Dec 1886 at Lower Light, South Australia.

George Whiting Badman was the son of Joel Badman (1853-1924) and Adelaide Louisa née Whiting (1864-1950) 

He married Ivy Clarice Bodey (1891–1966) on 21 Feb 1914 at the residence of J Thorne, Malvern, South Australia, Australia and divorced on 17 December 1920.

He married his second cousin, Rita Isabell Pank (17 September 1887 Adelaide – 4 April 1971 St Georges, South Australia), on 29 January 1923 at Dulwich, South Australia, Australia. She was the daughter of George Thomas Pank (1844-1916) and Mary Emma (formerly Hulbert née Badman). (1847-1925)

Together Rita and George had 2 daughters. Shirley (27 November 1924) & Marie Rita (3 April 1928) Both girls were born at "Rockford" Park Terrace, Wayville, South Australia

He died in a private hospital in Adelaide on 3 September 1953 at the age of 66.

References

Australian racehorse owners and breeders
1886 births
1953 deaths
Australian mining businesspeople